Plain vanilla is  an adjective describing the simplest version of something, without any optional extras, basic or ordinary. In analogy with the common ice cream flavour vanilla, which became widely and cheaply available with the development of artificial vanillin flavour.
Certain financial instruments, such as put options or call options, are often described as plain vanilla options. The opposite of plain vanilla options are exotic options.

See also
 Vanilla software, is a computer software which is not customized.
 Vanilla sex, sexual behavior which a culture regards as standard or conventional.

References

Options (finance)